Bettembourg is a commune and town in southern Luxembourg.  It is part of the canton of Esch-sur-Alzette, which is part of the district of Luxembourg.

, the town of Bettembourg, which lies in the east of the commune, has a population of 7,157.  Other towns within the commune include Abweiler, Fennange, Huncherange, and Noertzange.

The Parc Merveilleux children's amusement park is located just outside Bettembourg. Bettembourg Castle, located in the centre of the town, has a history starting in 1733 when it was built as the residence of a farming family. Today it houses the offices and services of the local commune and acts as the town hall of Bettembourg.

Twin towns — sister cities

Bettembourg is twinned with:
 Flaibano, Italy
 Valpaços, Portugal

Population

References

External links
 
 Official website

 
Communes in Esch-sur-Alzette (canton)
Towns in Luxembourg